Václav Klán (born 7 September 1993) is a Czech football player who currently plays for SK Uhelné sklady Prague.

References
 Profile at FC Zbrojovka Brno official site
 Profile at FK Viktoria Žižkov official site
 Profile at eurofotbal.cz

1993 births
Living people
Footballers from Prague
Czech footballers
Czech First League players
FK Bohemians Prague (Střížkov) players
FC Zbrojovka Brno players
Association football forwards
FC Sellier & Bellot Vlašim players
Loko Vltavín players
FK Viktoria Žižkov players